Diu College, is a general degree college situated in Diu. It was established in the year 2013. The college is affiliated with Saurashtra University. The college offers bachelor's degree courses in Science, Commerse and Arts.

Accreditation
The college is  recognized by the University Grants Commission (UGC).

References

External links
 

Universities and colleges in Dadra and Nagar Haveli and Daman and Diu
Educational institutions established in 2013
2013 establishments in Daman and Diu
Diu, India